Goodenia heatheriana is a species of flowering plant in the family Goodeniaceae and is endemic to Western Australia. It is a spreading annual herb with narrow egg-shaped leaves at the base of the plant and racemes of yellow flowers.

Description

Taxonomy and naming
Goodenia heatheriana was first formally described in 2000 by Leigh William Sage in the journal Nuytsia from specimens collected in the Parker Range in 1994. The specific epithet (heatheriana) honours Heather Sage, the wife of the author.

Distribution and habitat
This goodenia grows in low, open eucalypt woodland near Marvel Loch in the Coolgardie biogeographic region of Western Australia.

Conservation status
Goodenia heatheriana is classified as "Priority One" by the Government of Western Australia Department of Parks and Wildlife, meaning that it is known from only one or a few locations which are potentially at risk.

References

heatheriana
Eudicots of Western Australia
Plants described in 2000
Endemic flora of Western Australia